Overmono is a Welsh electronic music duo consisting of brothers Tom and Ed Russell.

History 
Both Tom and Ed had careers in music prior to the formation of Overmono. Tom made predominantly hard techno under the name 'Truss', and Ed as 'Tessela' with drum and bass and rave-inspired tracks including 2013's 'Hackney Parrot'. 

The brothers had also performed together under the name 'TR/ER' for a brief time in 2012. The deo began producing music together in 2015, with their first EP 'Arla' being released on XL Recordings in 2016. 

Alongside XL, the duo has also released music on their own label 'Poly Kicks' founded by Ed (aka 'Tessela') in 2013. The label has also released music from Joy Orbison and Special Request, and the Overmono remix of For Those I Love's 'I Have A Love' released in 2020. 

In 2021, the duo won 'UK's Best Live Act' at DJ Mag's Best of British award.

Overmono has frequently collaborated with Joy Orbison. Their first release as a trio was with 2019's 'Bromley / Still Moving' released on XL Recordings under the portmanteau 'Joy Overmono'. Their second release was in 2022 with 'Blind Date', featuring a vocal sample from artist ABRA.

Discography

EPs 

 Arla (XL Recordings, 2016)
 Arla II (XL Recordings, 2017)
 Arla III (XL Recordings, 2017)
 BMW Track / So U Kno (Poly Kicks, 2021)         
 Diamond Cut / Bby (XL Recordings, 2021)
 Cash Romantic (XL Recordings, 2022)

Albums 

 Good Lies (XL Recordings, 2023)

References

External links 

 
 
 

Welsh male musicians
Welsh electronic music groups
Electronic music duos
XL Recordings artists
Alternative dance musical groups